Vecherniy Bishkek (The Evening Bishkek) is a daily Russian language newspaper published in Kyrgyzstan. Founded in 1974, it was known as Vecherniy Frunze since 1991. It was established as a newspaper of Frunze City Committee of the Communist Party of Kirghizia. 

The owner of the paper is Alexander Kim who also owns Agym newspaper.

See also 
 List of newspapers in Kyrgyzstan

References

External links 
 

1974 establishments in the Soviet Union
Russian-language newspapers published in Kyrgyzstan
Publications established in 1974
Mass media in Bishkek